Tallinna JK Augur is an Estonian football club based in Keila. Founded in 2012, they currently play in the III Liiga, the fifth tier of Estonian football.

Players

Current squad
 ''As of 31 July 2018.

Statistics

League and Cup

References

Football clubs in Estonia
Association football clubs established in 2012
2012 establishments in Estonia